The Active Template Library (ATL) is a set of template-based C++ classes developed by Microsoft, intended to simplify the programming of Component Object Model (COM) objects. The COM support in Microsoft Visual C++ allows developers to create a variety of COM objects, OLE Automation servers, and ActiveX controls. ATL includes an object wizard that sets up primary structure of the objects quickly with a minimum of hand coding. On the COM client side ATL provides smart pointers that deal with COM reference counting. The library makes heavy use of the curiously recurring template pattern.

History 
COM objects can also be created with Microsoft Foundation Classes (MFC), but this leads to larger binaries that require support DLLs. ATL, on the other hand, is a more lightweight alternative in situations where the graphical user interface parts of MFC are not required.

In ATL version 7 (Visual Studio 2003), which directly succeeded version 3 (Visual Studio 6.0), a number of MFC classes like CString were made available in ATL, or more precisely moved to an ATLMFC common layer which is shared by both libraries. ATL version 7 also introduced attributes in C++ in an attempt to provide something similar to CLI attributes, however these have not been particularly successful, and have been deemphasized in ATL version 8 (Visual Studio 2005); the various wizards no longer generate them by default. Version 7 also introduced new string conversion classes.

On July 28, 2009, Microsoft released a patch to ATL to fix a bug that could allow ActiveX controls created using ATL to be vulnerable to a remote code execution security flaw.

Since Visual Studio 2013, ATL code in Visual C++ 2013 is static, eliminating the DLL.

Support classes 
ATL includes many RAII classes to simplify management of COM types. The most commonly used classes include:

 CComPtr<T> general-purpose smart-pointer,
 CComBSTR BSTR wrapper,
 CComVariant VARIANT wrapper, and
 CComSafeArray<T> SAFEARRAY wrapper.

Compiler COM support 
Although not formally part of ATL, Microsoft Visual C++ also includes additional C++ RAII classes to simplify management of COM types. These compiler COM support classes can be used as replacement for or in combination with ATL, and includes:

 _com_ptr_t smart-pointer that decorates the COM interface name with a "Ptr" suffix,
 _bstr_t BSTR wrapper,
 _variant_t VARIANT wrapper, and
 _com_error HRESULT wrapper.
Note that as of Visual Studio 2012, the compiler COM support classes does not include a SAFEARRAY wrapper.

See also 
 ATL Server
C++/CX
 OLE Automation
 Standard Template Library
 Windows Template Library
 Microsoft Windows SDK
 List of C++ template libraries

References

External links 
 Official MSDN reference documentation

C++ libraries
Template Library